Diploderma dymondi, also known commonly as Dymond's japalure, is a species of lizard in the family Agamidae. The species is endemic to China.

Etymology
The specific name, dymondi, is in honor of the Rev. Francis John "Frank" Dymond (1866–1932), who was a Methodist missionary in China.

Geographic range
D. dymondi is found in southern Sichuan Province and northern Yunnan Province, China.

Habitat

Description

Reproduction
D. dymondi is oviparous.

References

Further reading
Boulenger GA (1906). "Descriptions of new Reptiles from Yunnan". Annals and Magazine of Natural History, Seventh Series 17: 567–568. (Acanthosaura dymondi, new species).
Smith MA (1935). The Fauna of British India, Including Ceylon and Burma. Reptilia and Amphibia. Vol. II.—Sauria. London: Secretary of State for India in Council. (Taylor & Francis, printers). xiii + 440 pp. + Plate I + 2 maps. (Japalura dymondi, new combination, p. 172).
Wang K, Che J, Lin S, Deepak V, Aniruddha D, Jiang K, Jin J, Chen H, Siler CD (2018). "Multilocus phylogeny and revised classification for mountain dragons of the genus Japalura s.l. (Reptilia: Agamidae: Draconinae) from Asia". Zoological Journal of the Linnean Society 185 (1): 246–267. (Diploderma dymondi, new combination).

Diploderma
Reptiles of China
Reptiles described in 1906
Taxa named by George Albert Boulenger